Jiao Yunxiang (born 29 May 1956) is a Chinese athlete. She competed in the women's discus throw at the 1984 Summer Olympics.

References

1956 births
Living people
Athletes (track and field) at the 1984 Summer Olympics
Chinese female discus throwers
Olympic athletes of China
Place of birth missing (living people)
20th-century Chinese women